Fiona Bigwood (born 24 April 1976) is a British dressage rider, and winner of a silver medal in the team dressage event at the 2016 Summer Olympics.

Early life
Bigwood was born on 24 April 1976. By the time she was 10 years old, Bigwood rode Tanya Larrigan's old Grand Prix horse Salute on lease. She soon competed at the 1993 Junior European Championships and the Young Rider European Championships. As a teenager, she trained in Denmark and was educated at Croydon High School.

Career
In 1997, Bigwood became the youngest British rider to be selected for a Senior European Championships. In the same year, she won the British National Elementary title with Afrikka and was  shortlisted for the 1998 World Equestrian Games. Afterwards, she competed at the 2010 World Equestrian Games and at four European Dressage Championships (in 1999, 2005, 2007 and 2015). In 2014, she suffered a concussion after a fall while riding. As a result of her injury, Bigwood experiences double vision which means that she wears an eye patch while riding.

Upon returning to competitions, Bigwood earned a silver medal for Great Britain in the team dressage event at the 2016 Summer Olympics. However, she would later sell her silver medal winning horse "Atterupgaards Orthilia" to Danish rider Agnete Kirk Thinggaard.

Personal life
She was married with three children; her ex husband, Anders Dahl, is also a dressage rider.

In 2016, Bigwood and her husband relocated from Bourne Hill House from Horsham in West Sussex to Brantridge Park where they have established an equestrian centre.

Notable Horses 

 Mr G de Lully - 1993 Bay Swedish Warmblood Gelding (Gauguin de Lully x Ambassadeur)
 2005 European Championships - Team Fifth Place, Individual 20th Place
 2007 European Championships - Team Fifth Place, Individual 18th Place
 Wie-Atlantico De Ymas - 1999 Chestnut Hanoverian Gelding (Wie Weltmeyer x Rondo)
 2010 World Equestrian Games - Team Silver Medal, Individual 16th Place, Individual 12th Place Freestyle
 Atterupgaards Orthilia - 2005 Bay Oldenburg Mare (Gribaldi x Donnerschlag)
 2015 European Championships - Team Silver Medal, Individual Ninth Place
 2016 Rio Olympics - Team Silver Medal, Individual 17th Place

References

Living people
1976 births
British female equestrians
British dressage riders
Olympic medalists in equestrian
Equestrians at the 2016 Summer Olympics
Olympic equestrians of Great Britain
Medalists at the 2016 Summer Olympics
Olympic silver medallists for Great Britain
English expatriates in Germany
People educated at Croydon High School
People from Balcombe, West Sussex
People from Horsham